Agnites Vrolik (28 February 1810, Amsterdam – 8 June 1894, Arnhem) was a Dutch politician.

References
Dr. A. Vrolik at Parlement & Politiek

External links
 

1810 births
1894 deaths
Ministers of Finance of the Netherlands
Politicians from Amsterdam
Utrecht University alumni